OAS or Oas may refer to:

Chemistry
 O-Acetylserine, amino-acid involved in cysteine synthesis

Computers
 Open-Architecture-System, the main user interface of Wersi musical keyboards
 OpenAPI Specification (originally Swagger Specification), specification for machine-readable interface files for RESTful Web services
 Oracle Application Server, software platform

Medicine
 Open aortic surgery, surgical technique
 Oral allergy syndrome, food-related allergic reaction in the mouth
 2'-5'-oligoadenylate synthase, an enzyme
 OAS1, OAS2, OAS3, anti-viral enzymes in humans

Organizations
 Office of Aviation Services, agency of the United States Department of the Interior
 Ontario Archaeological Society, organization promoting archaeology within the Province of Ontario, Canada 
 Organisation Armée Secrète, French dissident terrorist organisation, active during the Algerian War (1954–62), fighting against Algerian independence
 Organization of American States, continental organization of the Western Hemisphere
 Oxford Art Society, society for artists in the city of Oxford, England

Transport
 Oasis LRT station, Singapore, LRT station abbreviation OAS

Other
 Ohio Auction School, school for auctioneers in Ohio, U.S.
 Old Age Security, social security payment available to most Canadians aged 65 or older
 Option-adjusted spread, the yield-curve spread of a fixed-income security, adjusted for the cost of embedded options
 Oas, Albay, municipality in the Philippines

See also 
 Oaş (disambiguation)